The Women's 1500 metre freestyle competition of the 2020 European Aquatics Championships was held on 20 and 21 May 2021.

Records
Before the competition, the existing world, European and championship records were as follows.

Results

Heats
The heats were started on 20 May at 11:29.

Final
The final was held on 21 May at 18:00.

References

External links

Women's 1500 metre freestyle